Sammamish is a city in King County, Washington, United States. The population was 67,455 at the 2020 census. Located on a plateau, the city is bordered by Lake Sammamish to the west and the Snoqualmie Valley to the east. Sammamish is a residential and very wealthy suburb of Seattle, located 20 miles away, with many residents commuting to nearby businesses. It is part of the Eastside.

The city was incorporated in 1999 and is the richest city with more than 5,000 people by median household income in Washington state. In 2019, it was also named the richest city in the U.S. among cities with a population greater than 65,000 people.

History
The Sammamish Plateau was part of unincorporated King County for most of its recorded history. The first settlers arrived in the late 19th century and established a trio of resorts by the 1930s. The plateau remained a mostly rural area until suburban homes, shopping centers, and schools were built in the 1970s and 1980s. A vote in 1991 to join neighboring Issaquah failed, as did a vote on incorporation the following year. A renewed movement to become a city, born of frustration with development policies set by the county government, met with voter approval in 1998. Sammamish was officially incorporated on August 31, 1999. The city annexed Klahanie on January 1, 2016.

Geography

The city is situated on the shores and hilly terrain east of Lake Sammamish. It is bordered to the south by Issaquah, to the northwest by Redmond, and to the west across Lake Sammamish by Bellevue. Beaver Lake and Pine Lake are the two biggest lakes in Sammamish.

Climate
Sammamish has a mild Marine West Coast or oceanic climate.

Surrounding cities

Demographics

According to the 2019 American Community Survey estimate, the median income for a household in the city is $188,120, and the median income for a family is $188,083. The per capita income for the city was $70,377. The U.S. Census Bureau estimated that the median household income in Sammamish was $183,038 in 2018, placing it first among U.S. cities with a population greater than 65,000.

Forbes ranked Sammamish 1st in its 2012 list of the "Friendliest Towns in the United States". Sammamish is also ranked as the 5th safest city in the U.S. In 2007, CNN Money ranked Sammamish as the 11th Best Place to Live in the United States, and subsequently ranked it as #12 in 2009 and #15 in 2011. Sammamish was also ranked the 9th Best Place to Live by Money.com in 2018

2010 census
As of the census of 2010, there were 45,780 people, 15,154 households, and 12,918 families living in the city. The racial makeup of the city was 74.7% White, 1.0% African American, 0.3% Native American, 19.3% Asian, 0.1% Pacific Islander, 0.9% from other races, and 3.7% from two or more races. Hispanic or Latino of any race were 3.9% of the population.

There were 15,154 households, of which 52.9% had children under the age of 18 living with them, 76.9% were married couples living together, 5.6% had a female householder with no husband present, 2.7% had a male householder with no wife present, and 14.8% were non-families. 11.4% of all households were made up of individuals, and 2.1% had someone living alone who was 65 years of age or older. The average household size was 3.01 and the average family size was 3.28.

The median age in the city was 37.7 years. 32.2% of residents were under the age of 18; 4.9% were between the ages of 18 and 24; 27.9% were from 25 to 44; 29.4% were from 45 to 64; and 5.7% were 65 years of age or older. The gender makeup of the city was 50.1% male and 49.9% female.

2000 census
As of the census of 2000, there were 34,104 people, 11,131 households, and 9,650 families living in the city.  The population density was 1,888.9 people per square mile (729.5/km2). There were 11,599 housing units at an average density of 642.4/sq mi (248.1/km2). The racial makeup of the city was 87.82% White, 0.85% African American, 0.29% Native American, 7.89% Asian, 0.09% Pacific Islander, 0.60% from other races, and 2.46% from two or more races. Hispanic or Latino of any race were 2.50% of the population.

There were 11,131 households, out of which 53.3% had children under the age of 18 living with them, 79.5% were married couples living together, 5.3% had a female householder with no husband present, and 13.3% were non-families. 9.4% of all households were made up of individuals, and 1.5% had someone living alone who was 65 years of age or older. The average household size was 3.06 and the average family size was 3.29.

In the city the population was spread out, with 33.4% under the age of 18, 4.8% from 18 to 24, 33.2% from 25 to 44, 24.6% from 45 to 64, and 4.0% who were 65 years of age or older. The median age was 35 years. For every 100 females, there were 101.7 males. For every 100 females age 18 and over, there were 98.5 males.

The median income for a household in the city was $101,592, and the median income for a family was $104,356. Males had a median income of $76,688 versus $47,164 for females. The per capita income for the city was $42,971. About 2.0% of the population and 1.6% of families were below the poverty line, including 1.7% of those under age 18 and 3.2% of those age 65 or over.

Parks
Sammamish has nine parks (Beaver Lake Park, Big Rock Park, East Sammamish Park, Ebright Creek Park, Evans Creek Preserve, NE Sammamish Park, Pine Lake Park, Sammamish Commons, Sammamish Landing). Soaring Eagle Regional Park and Duthie Hill Park abut the city and are on the plateau. East Lake Sammamish Trail runs along Lake Sammamish and connects to a regional trail system, like the Sammamish River Trail to the north, and the Issaquah-Preston Trail to the south.

Government

The Sammamish City Council is elected by the community. Of the seven council members, two members are elected as Mayor and Deputy Mayor. Council meetings are held at City Hall, part of the Sammamish Commons, which is also the site of Sammamish Library, a branch of the King County Library System.

Sammamish does not have its own post office. Eastside Fire and Rescue is contracted to provide fire services. Sammamish contracts with the King County Sheriff's Office for police services. Deputies assigned to Sammamish wear city uniforms and drive patrol cars marked with the city logo.

Education
Sammamish's public school system is served by two school districts.

North Sammamish is served by Lake Washington School District, and has two high schools (Eastlake, Tesla STEM), two middle schools (Inglewood, Renaissance School of Art and Reasoning), and five elementary schools (Elizabeth Blackwell, Rachel Carson, Christa McAuliffe, Margaret Mead, Samantha Smith).

South Sammamish is served by Issaquah School District, and has two high schools (Issaquah, Skyline), three middle schools (Beaver Lake, Pacific Cascade, Pine Lake), and seven elementary schools (Cascade Ridge, Cedar Trails, Challenger, Creekside, Discovery, Endeavour, Sunny Hills).

A very small portion to the east is in the Snoqualmie Valley School District.

Eastside Catholic School is a private school in the city.

Central Washington University is a public university that opened a Sammamish location on September 20, 2017.

Transportation
Sammamish is served by three major north–south roads: East Lake Sammamish Parkway, 228th Avenue, and 244th Avenue. They connect to State Route 202 to the north, providing access to Redmond, and Interstate 90 to the south in Issaquah. A regional freeway, Interstate 605, has been proposed several times since the 1960s to run through Sammamish, but has not been built.

Bus service is provided by King County Metro routes 216, 219, 269, and Sound Transit Express route 554 to Redmond, Issaquah, and Downtown Seattle. South Sammamish Park and Ride is the city's transit center with 265 parking stalls. Metro began running dial-a-ride buses to the Sammamish Plateau in 1993, and it later extended commuter services in the early 2000s.

The King County government began construction of an  bike trail on the east side of Lake Sammamish in 1998, replacing a disused railway.

Places
 Sahalee Country Club (27-hole golf course)
 The Plateau Club (18-hole golf course, recreation center)
 Aldarra Golf Club (18-hole golf course, formerly the site of the Boeing family farm)
 Sammamish Commons (City Hall, Sammamish Library, Community and Aquatic Center)
 Pine Lake Village (103,000 sq ft strip mall, anchored by QFC and Rite-Aid)
 Sammamish Highlands (101,000 sq ft strip mall, anchored by Safeway, Bartell Drugs, and Trader Joe's)
 The Village at Sammamish Town Center (113,000 sq ft mixed-use development, anchored by Metropolitan Market)
 Klahanie Shopping Center (67,000 sq ft strip mall, anchored by QFC)
 Saffron Center (50,000 sq ft mixed-use development, anchored by Sammamish Cafe and EvergreenHealth)

Notable people
 Hunter Bryant, professional American football player
 Blake Hawksworth, professional baseball player
 Kim Schrier, U.S. congresswoman
 Matisse Thybulle, professional basketball player
 Surf Mesa, musician

References

External links

 Official website

 
Cities in King County, Washington
Cities in the Seattle metropolitan area
Cities in Washington (state)
Populated places established in 1999
1999 establishments in Washington (state)
Washington placenames of Native American origin